Emlyon Business School is a French business school in Lyon, France, established in 1872, and affiliated with the Lyon Chamber of Commerce and Industry. A grande école de commerce, Emlyon Business School offers a wide range of academic programs, including the Global BBA, Masters in Management, M.Sc. in Finance, MBA, and Exec. MBA degrees, alongside Specialized Masters (M.Sc., M.S.) programs, and a Ph.D. program in Management. The school also provides a wide portfolio of Executive Education programs for senior executives & experienced managers.

The school maintains seven campuses: in the Urban Community of Lyon (Écully), Saint-Étienne and Paris in France, Shanghai in China and Bhubaneswar & Mumbai in India. Emlyon Business School is a member of the Conférence des Grandes Écoles, and holds the Triple Accreditation Status (EQUIS, AACSB, and AMBA). 

Consistently ranked among the best business schools in France, Emlyon Business School ranks as a #Top15 Business School in Europe in the FT European Business Schools ranking. Among the programs, its flagship Masters in Management (Program Grand École) is ranked among the #Top10 programs worldwide in the 2022 FT MiM ranking.

History 
Emlyon Business School was established in 1872, and is one of the oldest business schools in France. Formerly known as ESCAE Lyon, ÉSC de Lyon, and EM Lyon, the school has been named as Emlyon Business School since 2016. In September 2018, Emlyon Business School, historically belonging to the Lyon Métropole Saint-Étienne Roanne Chamber of Commerce and Industry (lCC), became a public limited company. Since then, Emlyon Business School has been a subsidiary of Early Makers Group SA., and whose capital is open to alumni, group employees, and investment funds Bpifrance and Qualium, while being managed by CCI Lyon Métropole.

 1872: Ecole Supérieure de Commerce de Lyon (ESC Lyon) founded with support from the public Lyon Chamber of Commerce.
 1972: New campus opened in Ecully, France.
 1997: ESC Lyon is renamed Ecole de Management de Lyon (EM LYON). 
 2005: Awarded the Triple Crown: AMBA, EQUIS and AACSB accreditation.
 2007: Shanghai Campus established in China.
 2014: New campus opened in Saint-Etienne, France.
 2015: Casablanca Campus established in Morocco. | Partnership with IBM.
 2016: Establishment of Paris Campus in France.
 2016: Establishment of Alliance Lyon Grenoble Business School, with Grenoble École de Management.
 2018: Bhubaneswar Campus established in India in collaboration with Xavier University. School legal structure is changed to a: public limited company.
 2021: Mumbai Campus established in India in partnership with St. Xavier's College, Mumbai.

Grande École System 
Emlyon Business School is a grande école, a French institution of higher education that is separate from, but parallel and connected to the main framework of the French public university system. Similar to the Ivy League in the United States, Oxbridge in the UK, and C9 League in China, grandes écoles are elite academic institutions that admit students through an extremely competitive process. Alums go on to occupy elite positions within governments, public administrations, and corporate firms globally.

Degrees from grande écoles are accredited by the Conférence des Grandes Écoles, and awarded by the Ministry of National Education (France). Higher education business degrees in France are organized into three levels thus facilitating international mobility: the Licence/Bachelors, Masters, and Doctorate degrees. A Bachelor's degree is awarded requires the completion of 180 ECTS credits (bac+3); a Masters, requires an additional 120 ECTS credits (bac+5). The highly coveted PGE (Program Grand École) ends with the awarding of Masters in Management (M.M.) degree.

International Rankings 

In 2022, Emlyon Business School ranked 38th globally in the THE Global University Employability Ranking. It is 2nd highest ranked business school in France (after HEC Paris), and has retained its position in the Global Top 40 for the sixth consecutive year.

Degree programs

Undergraduate Programs 

 Bachelor of Business Administration (Global BBA)
 Bachelor of Science (B.Sc.) in Data Science for Responsible Business (Jointly with École Centrale de Lyon)

Master of Management Programs 

 M.Sc. in Management (Programme Grande École) (QS Management: #4 in France | FT Management: #4 in France )
 M.Sc. in Management (Programme Grande École): European Triple Degree, with Ludwig Maximilian University of Munich & University of Lancaster.

Master of Finance Programs 

 M.Sc. in Finance (QS Finance: #4 in France | FT Finance: #5 in France )

Graduate Programs 
 M.Sc. in Cybersecurity & Defense Management
M.Sc. in Data Science & Artificial Intelligence Strategy (QS Business Analytics: #4 in France)
M.Sc. in Digital Marketing & Data Science (QS Marketing: #4 in France)
M.Sc. in Global Innovation & Entrepreneurship
 M.Sc. in Health Management & Data Intelligence (with ENS Saint-Étienne)
 M.Sc. in High-End Brand Management
 M.Sc. in International Hospitality Management (with Institut Paul Bocuse)
M.Sc. in International Marketing & Business Development
 M.Sc. in Luxury Management & Marketing
M.Sc. in Sports Industry Management
M.Sc. in Supply Chain & Purchasing Management
M.Sc. in Strategy & Consulting

Specialized Masters Programs  
 Specialised Master (MS) in Agro-Business Management (with Institut agro Montpellier)
 Specialised Master (MS) in Energy Transition Management (with ECAM LaSalle )
Specialised Master (MS) in Entrepreneurship & Innovation Management
 Specialised Master (MS) in Digital Transformation, Marketing & Strategy
 Specialised Master (MS) in International Business Strategy & Development (with CentraleSupélec)
Specialised Master (MS) in International Legal Manager

MBA 
The MBA program at Emlyon Business School is an intensive 1-year full-time programme with a September intake. The program is highly international, with over 70% of students coming from outside of France, from over 30 different nationalities, and with an average of 7 years of full-time work experience.

Students in the MBA program can choose to specialise in one of the 9 specialisations: Business Development, Business Consulting, Finance Management, Project Management, Entrepreneurship, Supply Chain Management, Marketing Management, Sales Management, and Product Management.

As a part of the program, candidates can spend a trimester as an exchange student in over 15 business schools around the world, including HEC Montreal, Smith School of Business at Queen's University, Schulich School of Business at York University, IAE Business School, Alliance-Manchester Business School at the University of Manchester, University of St. Gallen, MIP Politécnico di Milano, University of Stellenbosch Business School, Cheung Kong Graduate School of Business, and Keio Business School at Keio University.

The MBA program at Emlyon Business School is one of the top MBA programs in Europe, and consistently ranks as one of the Top 5 MBA programs in France in both FT and QS rankings.

Executive MBA 
Emlyon Business School offers an Executive MBA program for experienced managers and business executives with September and June intakes. Executives can choose to complete in either a 20-month standard or a 10-month fast-track format. Emlyon Business School's Exec. MBA students can attend the program at both its Paris & Lyon campuses. The Executive MBA program at Emlyon Business School is extremely reputed in France, and is ranked within the Top 30 Exec. MBA programs globally in both FT & QS rankings.

Executive Education 
Emlyon Business School offers a range of programmes aimed at executives and experienced professionals. These programs include the Executive Masters in General Management program, and a wide range of Certificate, Open, and Custom Programmes.

Ph.D. Program in Management 
The Ph.D. in Management program at Emlyon Business School trains individuals for careers in research and academia. It currently offers three specialisations: Entrepreneurship, Organizational Theory, & Strategy, and takes 5–6 years to complete. The first two years of the Ph.D. program are devoted to coursework, while the remaining three years are dedicated to research. All Ph.D. students at Emlyon Business School receive a full tuition waiver, an annual fellowship for a period of five years, and research support funding.

International Partnerships 
Emlyon Business School has partnered with and collaborated with over 200 business schools and universities around the world for academic exchange, double-degree programs, and research activities. Partner schools include UC Berkeley, UC Los Angeles, HEC Montreal, Queen's University, IAE Business School, University of São Paulo, CBS Denmark, Aalto University, BI Norwegian Business School, Stockholm School of Economics, University of Mannheim, Bocconi University, EU Rotterdam, IE University, University of Cape Town, University of Stellenbosch, IIM Ahmedabad, Keio University, Singapore Management University, Seoul National University, and Monash University, among over 200 others.

Research 
Emlyon Business School is home to 8 Research Centers, 4 Research Institutes, and offers a Ph.D. program (École Doctorale en Sciences Economiques et de Gestion) in collaboration with the Université de Lyon. As a research-focussed institution, the school consistently ranks among the Top 3 Schools for research in Management in France.

Research Centres
AIM Research Center on Artificial Intelligence in Value Creation: Research on how AI and related emerging technologies affect value creation in human interactions and consumer behavior.
Research Center For Work, Technology, and Organization (WTO): Research on the role of professions and expertise in shaping technological, organizational, and institutional change.
Organizations, Critical & Ethnographic Perspectives Research Center (OCE): Research on critical and political perspectives in organizational and institutional dynamics.
Entrepreneurship and Innovation Research Center (EIRC): Research on entrepreneurship & innovation.
Strategy, Organization, & Management (STORM) Research Center: Research on strategy & organizations.
Lifestyle Research Center: Research on ongoing changes in lifestyle that impact market formation and evolution as well as branding.
QUANT Research Center: Research on analyzing, modelling, simulating and optimizing management systems.
Behavioural Research in Organizations (BRiO) Centre: Research on organizational behaviour.
Research Institutes

 L'Institut Français de Gouvernement des Entreprises (French Institute for Corporate Governance) 
 L'institute de L’Intrapreneuriat (Institute of Intrapreneurship)
 Ethnographic Institute
 AIM (AI in Management) Institute

Student life 
There are a total 56 student-led associations at Emlyon Business School across its three primary campuses, which host a cumulative of over 600 student-led events each year. Associations include Raid Hannibal, Ski Club, Diplo'Mates, Le Racing Club, Lux'em, and Club Voile (the Sailing Club).

The school also hosts the student association, The Petit Paumé, which is the second-largest student association in France in terms of financial means. The Petit Paumé is responsible for the design and distribution of an annual critical and free guide of the city of Lyon.

The Sup de Coteaux association hosts the "Le défi de Bacchus" event, which is the biggest wine-testing competition in Europe, gathering both students and professionals.

Notable alumni 
The alumni association of Emlyon Business School is called Emlyon Forever, and counts over 35000+ alumni in 130 countries.

 Jean-Pascal Tricoire, MBA, Chairman and CEO of Schneider Electric
 Alexandre Popoff, Executive VP Eastern Europe, Africa, Middle East at L’Oréal
 Florence Pourchet Co-head of Global Banking Americas, Head of CIB Hispanic LATAM at BNP Paribas CIB
 Isabelle Huault, Présidente Université Paris Dauphine
 Florence Rollet, Former head of Marketing at Julius Baer Group and European VP for Tiffany and Co.
 Marion Maréchal,  MBA, French Politician 
 Bernard Fornas, Former Chairman and CEO of Cartier (jeweler), Former Co-CEO of the Richemont Group
 Emmanuel Trivin, CEO of Butagaz
 Patrick Dupuis, Global CFO of PayPal
 Clotilde Delbos, deputy CEO of Renault
 Gwendal Peizerat, Olympic Champion Ice Dancer
 Frank Bournois, Dean of ESCP Business School
 Valérie Chapoulaud-Floquet, former CEO of Rémy Cointreau
 Christian Ngan, CEO and Founder of Madlyn Cazalis

References

See also 

 Conférence des Grandes écoles
 Education in France
 University of Lyon

External links 
 
 
 

1872 establishments in France
Educational institutions established in 1872
Emlyon Business School
Grandes écoles
Private universities and colleges in France
Business schools in France
Universities and colleges in Lyon
Business schools in China
Business schools in Morocco
Business schools in India